

September 1, 1980 (Monday) 

Chun Doo Hwan was inaugurated as the new President of South Korea.
Terry Fox, an amputee who had started a transcontinental run across Canada on April 12, to raise money for cancer research, was forced to end after having run  of the nearly  journey.  Having started from St John's, Newfoundland and Labrador on the Atlantic coast with a goal of reaching the Pacific Ocean port of Victoria, British Columbia, Fox had raised US$1.7 million before suffering shortness of breath and nausea outside of Thunder Bay, Ontario, where he was taken to the Port Arthur General Hospital, originally for stomach flu. The next day, Fox announced that the cancer that had taken his leg had returned and had spread to his lungs.
Francisco Villagrán Kramer resigned from his position as Vice President of Guatemala in a protest against the increased repression of human rights by President Romeo Lucas García.

September 2, 1980 (Tuesday) 
Joseph Bonanno, a New York mobster known as "Joe Bananas", was convicted of a felony for the first time in a criminal career that dated back more than 50 years, when he began as a gun runner for Al Capone.  Born in Sicily, Bonanno, aged 75, had avoided conviction for other charges during his time as a crime boss but was finally proven guilty of conspiracy to interfere with a federal grand jury investigation of his son.
Announcements were made in both Tripoli and Damascus that the nations of Libya and Syria would merge into a single republic, but details of the union were not disclosed.  President Muammar Gaddafi of Libya urged the parliament of the north African nation to approve the merger, adding "Either Libya turns into a unionist state and merges with Syria and bears the losses of the Arab nation, or I shall go to Upper Galilee" (in northern Israel) "as a commando myself with my rifle."  Syria's President Hafez al-Assad sent a cable to Gaddafi agreeing to the merger, which would never actually take place.  The formal merger agreement was signed on September 10.

September 3, 1980 (Wednesday) 
The third of three major concessions by Poland's Communist government to end a labor strike took place as the Jastrzębie agreement was signed in the coal mining town of Jastrzębie-Zdrój.  In addition to raising wages and permitting miners to organize their own union, the government brought an end to mining on Saturday and Sunday. 
Zimbabwe broke diplomatic and consular relations with South Africa, closing its missions in Pretoria and in Cape Town that had been established by Rhodesia's white-minority government and recalling the staffs.  Zimbabwe's Prime Minister Robert Mugabe asked South Africa to close its diplomatic mission in the Zimbabwean capital, Salisbury (now Harare).  At the same time, the Foreign Ministry noted that Zimbabwe would maintain its trade mission office at Johannesburg and that South Africa would retain its trade section in Salisbury.
Born: Jennie Finch, American women's softball pitcher; in La Mirada, California
Died: 
Dirch Passer, 54, Danish comedian, and film and stage actor, died from heart failure.  He collapsed, while in costume, as he was preparing to go onstage in the opening act of the Tivoli Revue at the Glassalen theater in Copenhagen. 
Duncan Renaldo (stage name for Vasile Dumitru Cugheanos), 76, Romanian-born American TV actor known of portraying The Cisco Kid in the U.S. television western of the same name.
Barbara O'Neil, 70, American film actress known for portraying the role of mother to lead characters, notably as Scarlett O'Hara's mother in the 1939 production of Gone with the Wind

September 4, 1980 (Thursday) 

U.S. anti-war activist Abbie Hoffman, a fugitive for the past six years after going into hiding while out on bail for a 1974 indictment for allegedly selling cocaine to undercover agents, voluntarily surrendered to the federal authorities at the U.S. District Court in New York City.  The court allowed him to be released without bond on Hoffman's pledge to return for a later hearing on the narcotics and bail-jumping charges.  Hoffman, founder of the Youth International Party whose members called themselves "Yippies", had undergone plastic surgery while a fugitive and had been living openly under the alias of "Barry Freed", even testifying before a U.S. Senate subcommittee in 1979.
Born: Max Greenfield, American TV actor, in Dobbs Ferry, New York
Died: Pepe Abad, 48, Spanish-born Chilean journalist and anchorman for the Televisión Nacional de Chile network

September 5, 1980 (Friday) 
Mothers Against Drunk Driving (MADD) was founded by Candy Lightner of Fair Oaks, California, (originally as "Mothers Against Drunk Drivers"), four months after her daughter had been killed by a drunk driver on May 3.  An author would note 35 years later that "By the late 1990s MADD had achieved its goal of lowering the BAC (minimum legal blood alcohol content level) in most states to .08 ... Remarkably, in less than 20 years the modest efforts of a grieving mother and a few American citizens had evolved into a sophisticated organization that defined an emerging social issue... powerful enough to shape national legislation and see it through into law.". 
At the opening ceremony, a school bus was the first vehicle to traverse the tunnel, which had taken 10 years to build and had cost US$486,000,000 and the lives of 19 workers. In that the tunnel was toll-free, detractors joked that "The Italians built it, the Germans use it and the Swiss pay for it." 
In Spain, the first hypermarket, Hipercor, was inaugurated on September 5, 1980, opening in Seville.

September 6, 1980 (Saturday)
 
Edward Gierek, the de facto leader of Poland for almost a decade since becoming the First Secretary of the ruling Polish United Workers' Party (PZPA), was removed from office by the Party's Central Committee after the concessions made by the government to the Solidarność trade union.  The day before, the government reported that Gierek had been admitted to a hospital for a heart ailment, and followed at 1:30 in the morning with the announcement.  In a fashion similar to the 1970 dismissal of Gierek's predecessor in 1970 (and common in Communist nations at the time), the official statement said that Gierek had asked to be relieved of his responsibilities for health reasons.  Gierek would live until 2001.  The Party named Stanisław Kania, a member of the PZPA Politburo, as Gierek's successor. 
Born: 
Samuel Peter, Nigerian professional boxer, billed as "The Nigerian Nightmare"; WBC world heavyweight champion for seven months in 2008; in the Akwa Ibom State
Joseph Yobo, Nigerian soccer football center and national team member from 2001 to 2014; in Kono, Rivers State

September 7, 1980 (Sunday) 

Hua Guofeng resigned from the position as Premier of the People's Republic of China, which he had held since 1976, in what one reporter described as "China's most orderly transfer of administrative authority in this century."    In his resignation speech, made at the meeting of the National People's Congress in Beijing, Hua (who remained the Chairman of the Chinese Communist Party), asked the delegates to approve Zhao Ziyang as his replacement. 
In his speech, Chairman Hua also announced that the experimental one-child policy, used by individual cities since 1979, would be mandated nationwide "so that the rate of population growth may be brought under control as soon as possible", implementing what one reporter described as "the most ambitious population-control policy ever adopted by a major power."
The 32nd Primetime Emmy Awards were held in Pasadena, California, but 51 of the 52 nominated actors did not show up for the U.S. television awards.  The boycott by celebrities came during the ongoing strike by members of the Screen Actors Guild (SAG) and the American Federation of Television and Radio Artists (AFTRA).  The only exception to the actors' boycott was Powers Boothe, who won the award for "Outstanding Actor in a Dramatic Special".  Booth, who received a standing ovation, said in his acceptance speech, "This is either the most courageous moment of my career or the stupidest."   
John McEnroe, who had lost to Björn Borg in July in a close match at Wimbledon, defeated Borg in the finals of the U.S. Open of tennis in another close match that came down to the final set.  McEnroe had won the first two sets, 7-6 and 6–1, and Borg tied by winning the next two sets, 7-6 and 7–5.  McEnroe defended his 1979 U.S. Open championship in the final set, winning 6 games to 4.
Born: 
Nikki Jamal, Azerbaijani-born English pop music singer for the duo Ell & Nikki; as Nigar Mutallibzadeh in Baku, Azerbaijan SSR, Soviet Union.
Gabriel Milito, Argentine soccer football defender; in Bernal

September 8, 1980 (Monday) 
In the largest troop maneuvers on German soil since the end of World War II, both the United States and other North Atlantic Treaty Organization (NATO) allies commenced war games in West Germany while the Soviet Union and its Warsaw Pact allies did the same in East Germany. NATO's "Autumn Forge" exercise involved more than 250,000 troops from 11 nations in land, air and sea operations and was coordinated from RAF Gütersloh.
The United States and China reached an agreement to begin regular commercial airline flights between the two nations for the first time since 1949, when the People's Republic of China was proclaimed.  On December 7, Pan American World Airways (Pan Am) would become the first U.S. airline to land in China under the new agreement, with the arrival of Pan Am Flight 10, a Boeing 747, in Beijing. 
The Sun, at the time Britain's highest circulating newspaper, became the first to reveal the romance of Prince Charles and Lady Diana Spencer, with the headline "HE'S IN LOVE AGAIN! LADY DI IS THE NEW GIRL FOR CHARLES?"  
Died: 
Willard Libby, 71, American chemist who perfected the development of radiocarbon dating that determined the approximate age of archaeological and palaeontological finds; 1960 laureate of the Nobel Prize in Chemistry
Keith Muckelroy, 29, British maritime archaeologist, from a diving accident

September 9, 1980 (Tuesday) 
All 44 people aboard the British freighter MV Derbyshire were killed when the ship sank in heavy waves brought by Typhoon Orchid.  The 91,655 ton ship is the largest British vessel to ever be lost at sea.  No distress signal was sent and although there were no surviving witnesses to the sinking, and independent investigator concluded that the typhoon was capable of generating waves as high as  that would also have destroyed the hatch covers to allow water to enter   With Carter absent, Anderson and Republican nominee Ronald Reagan appeared in Baltimore and before a national television audience.  A Carter versus Reagan debate would take place on October 28, seven days before the 1980 U.S. presidential election.
The Intelligence Oversight Act was signed into law by President Carter, requiring U.S. government agencies to report covert actions to the intelligence committees of both the U.S. Senate and the U.S. House of Representatives.
Nine days after the overthrow of the government in Turkey, former Admiral Bülent Ulusu became Prime Minister and formed a civilian government of 26 ministers (including seven other retired military officers).  The cabinet also had 13 former government ministers, including Turgut Ozal, the only holdover from the cabinet of deposed Prime Minister Suleyman Demirel. Demirel and most of the former cabinet remained in detention.  
Religious services were broadcast on the radio in Poland for the first time since the 1947 foundation of the Communist-governed Polish People's Republic.  The concessions were made by Poland's government as part of the August 31 agreement with striking shipyard workers.
The New York Cosmos defeated the Fort Lauderdale Strikers, 3 to 0, at Soccer Bowl '80, the championship of the North American Soccer League, the premier professional league for U.S. soccer football.  The game was played before 50,768 people at RFK Stadium in Washington, DC. Giorgio Chinaglia of Italy, the NASL's all-time leading scorer, made the last two goals.
Born: 
Kareena Kapoor Khan, Indian film actress and six-time Filmfare Award winner; in Mumbai
Autumn Reeser, American TV actress noted for starring in multiple Hallmark Channel romances; in La Jolla, California

September 22, 1980 (Monday) 
The Iran–Iraq War began with a surprise attack by the Iraqi Air Force on 10 Iranian airfields, in an unsuccessful attempt to destroy most of Iran's combat aircraft.  Air raids were made by 36 MiG-23 fighters and 92 other Iraqi planes   on Tabriz, Hamadan, Dizful, Isfahan, Ahwaz, Agha Jari, Bushire, Abadan, and Shiraz, as well as Tehran's airport. At the same time, tanks rolled across the Iraq border into Iran's Kermanshah Province.  The next day, ground troops crossed from Iraq into Iran in three simultaneous attacks and captured Iran's oil-rich Khuzestan Province at the north of the Persian Gulf.  Two of the six divisions of the Iraqi Army began a siege of the cities of Abadan and Khorramshahr. Iran responded with the aerial bombing the same day of Iraqi bases at Hamedan and Bushehr.  The war would last until August 20, 1988, at a loss of as many as 500,000 Iraqi troops, 600,000 Iranian troops and 100,000 civilians in the two nations.  
Serial killer Joseph G. Christopher began the random murders of 12 African-American victims, by shooting a 14-year-old boy outside of a supermarket in Buffalo, New York.  The next day, two black men were shot and killed within hours of each other, and a fourth victim was killed on September 23.  Christopher, a paranoid schizophrenic who had been turned away earlier in the month from a psychiatric facility when he wanted to admit himself, joined the U.S. Army and stabbed two men in Buffalo while on furlough from Fort Benning in Georgia.  His string of killings finally ended on January 18 when he was arrested at Fort Benning for trying to kill another black soldier. He received a 60-year prison sentence in 1982 after being convicted of three of the September shootings.  Christopher would tell The Buffalo News in 1983 that he killed 13 people, all black men, because "that was the directive" from "a collection of people".  Christopher would die of cancer in 1993 while in prison.  
Procter & Gamble took the Rely brand tampons off of the market after the Centers for Disease Control identified the product as more likely to cause toxic shock syndrome than any other product.  The recall order and an order to halt production was made on order of P&G chairman Edward Harness.  Since 1975, 652 women had been infected with toxic shock syndrome from use of tampons, and 63 of them had died.

September 23, 1980 (Tuesday) 
The National Security Ordinance went into effect in India hours after it had been proclaimed that night by India's President Neelam Sanjiva Reddy.  Promulgated as part of the President's emergency powers, the ordinance gave giving the national and the state governments broad authority for preventive detention" of citizens suspected of "acting in any manner prejudicial to the security of the State"; "acting in any manner prejudicial to the maintenance of Public order"; or "acting in any manner prejudicial to the maintenance of supplies and services essential to the community".  Under the ordinance and the acts that followed on December 27, a person arrested could be detained in any designated facility anywhere in India. 
Tokyo's oldest daily newspaper, The Asahi Shimbun, became the first paper to be produced entirely by computer from the time of composing to being sent out for delivery.  "From the moment reporters deliver their handwritten copy to keyboard operators to the time when bundles of papers wrapped in plastic drop into delivery trucks, The New York Times noted, "production is directed by computer."  The process included allowing editors to revise the pages and the layout from their own computer terminals before having the images scanned to printing plates. 
In a referendum in the U.S. state of Maine, voters overwhelmingly rejected a proposal to close down the state's only nuclear reactor facility, the Maine Yankee Nuclear Power Plant. The election was the first in the United States since the 1979 meltdown of one of the Three Mile Island reactors in Pennsylvania.  After the plant became too expensive to maintain, it would close in 1996.
After weeks of strikes at the Lenin Shipyard in Gdańsk, Poland, the nationwide independent trade union Solidarity was established.
Two days after being diagnosed with brain cancer,  reggae singer Bob Marley performed his final concert, held at the Stanley Theater in Pittsburgh.  On the morning of the next concert date in Philadelphia, a reporter noted, "If you were planning to see Bob Marley and the Wailers tonight, you should make new plans.  The man's sick and at least the Philadelphia and Washington chunks of his tour are canceled."  He would die less than eight months later on May 11, 1981.
Died: Jim Fouché, 82, State President of South Africa from 1968 to 1975

September 24, 1980 (Wednesday) 
William Lee Bergstrom made gambling history with a successful $777,000 cash wager on a roll of the dice at the craps table at the Horseshoe Casino in Las Vegas.  The amount would be equivalent to almost $2.4 million in 2020.
Born: Victoria Pendleton, British bicyclist, two-time Olympic gold medalist and six-time world champion; in Stotfold, Bedfordshire

September 25, 1980 (Thursday) 
The Mariel boatlift, which had allowed boats from the United States to transport 125,262 people who were permitted to leave Cuba, came to an end.  Cuban officials ordered the remaining U.S. boats in the port of Mariel to leave.
Three days into its invasion of Iran, troops from neighboring Iraq captured the port of Khorramshahr, marching into the oil-exporting site after a two-day siege.
A settlement was reached in the 67-day long strike by U.S. film and television actors, allowing production to begin again on TV shows.
The United States retained yachting's America's Cup, winning for the 25th consecutive time since the international challenge had been started in 1851. Dennis Conner sailed the sloop Freedom, appearing for the U.S. and the New York Yacht Club, defeating Australia (and its yacht, Australia, skippered by James Hardy) in the fifth race of the best-of-seven series.
Born: T.I. (stage name for Clifford Harris Jr.), American rap artist and record executive; in Atlanta
Died: 
John Bonham, 32, English musician and drummer for Led Zeppelin, died of pulmonary aspiration from vomiting and choking following the ingestion of over one liter of vodka in the 24 hours before his death.
Lewis Milestone (born Leib Milstein), 84, Russian-born American film director known for All Quiet on the Western Front, The Front Page, Of Mice and Men and Ocean's 11
Marie Under, 97, celebrated Estonian language poet
Saville Sax, 56, American spy

September 26, 1980 (Friday) 
Thirteen people were killed and 225 injured by the explosion of a bomb planted by a right-wing terrorist at an Oktoberfest festival in Munich, West Germany. The dead included the person who had planted the bomb, 21-year-old  University of Tübingen student Gundolf Köhler, a member of the neo-Nazi Wehrsportgruppe Hoffmann.
A prototype of the Chinese Shanghai Y-10 airliner, comparable to a Boeing 707, made its first flight after ten years of planning.  Because of political disagreements between the national Ministry of Aviation and the government of Shanghai, China's national airline (CAAC) refused to invest in the aircraft.  CAAC had already purchased 10 Boeing 707 airplanes in 1972, and considered the design to be more than 20 years out of date. 
The Central Committee of the Chinese Communist Party issued a letter to its 38,000,000 members, and to the 50 million members of the Communist Youth League of China, ordering them to comply with the new nationwide one-child policy in order to set a good example, and directed the members to use "patient and painstaking persuasion" to educate non-members on the importance of birth control.
Born: 
Daniel Sedin, Swedish ice hockey winger who had 18 seasons with the Vancouver Canucks; 2011 Ted Lindsay Award and Art Ross Trophy winner; in Örnsköldsvik
Henrik Sedin, Swedish ice hockey center who had 18 seasons with the Vancouver Canucks; 2010 Hart Memorial Trophy and Art Ross Trophy winner; in Örnsköldsvik.  The identical twin brothers were teammates in the NHL from 2000–01 to 2017–18.

September 27, 1980 (Saturday)

By a single vote, the economic proposals of Italy's Prime Minister Francesco Cossiga failed to win approval in Camara dei deputati, failing 297 to 298.  At least 30 members of the governing Democrazia Cristiana (DC) party had previously stated that they would go against the economic proposals.  Two DC members who had expressed support for Cossiga, and presumabley would have potentially made the vote 299 to 298 in his favor, arrived several minutes too late to participate, including Mariapia Garavaglia.  Fifteen minutes after the vote was announced, Prime Minister Cossiga announced his resignation along with his entire cabinet, which included a coalition of Socialists and Republicans.  On October 18, Arnaldo Forlani was appointed Prime Minister and formed a new coalition.
The Richmond Tigers defeated the Collingwood Magpies, 159 to 78, to win the Victorian Football League's Grand Final and the championship of Australian rules football. The match took place in front of 113,461 spectators at the Melbourne Cricket Ground.

September 28, 1980 (Sunday) 
The Washington Post newspaper published the feature article "Jimmy's World" on its front page, a story by reporter Janet Cooke that began "Jimmy is 8 years old and a third-generation heroin addict, a precocious little boy with sandy hair, velvety brown eyes and needle marks freckling the baby-smooth skin of his thin brown arms."  Copyrighted by the Post and reprinted by other newspapers, Cooke's story would win a Pulitzer Prize for feature writing on April 13, 1981.  Two days later, Cooke admitted to executive editor Benjamin Bradlee that she had fabricated the story.  In a telegram to the Pulitzer Prize Foundation, Bradlee returned the prize and wrote that Cooke had conceded "that her story about an 8-year-old-heroin addict was in fact a composite, that the quotes attributed to a child were in fact fabricated and that certain events described as eyewitnessed did not in fact happen."  
The first multiparty elections since 1968 in Panama were conducted as 79 candidates campaigned for the 19 directly elected seats of the 56 seat Executive Council of the National Assembly.  The other 37 members were selected by the government as part of the National Assembly of Municipal Representatives.  As a result, the Associated Press noted at the time, "The elections will not tip the balance of power regardless of who wins" and the pro-government municipal representatives would retain majority control even if the opposition won all 19 seats.

September 29, 1980 (Monday) 
The reputation of Hu Feng, a disgraced former high-level Chinese official and a member of the Politburo of the Communist Party of China, was officially rehabilitated by order of the Party.  Hu had been imprisoned from 1955 to 1979 as a "counter-revolutionary"  after openly opposing Chairman Mao Zedong's policies on art and literature.  "Hu Feng fan ge ming ji tuan an" ("The case of Hu Feng's counter-revolutionary clique"),
Born: Zachary Levi, American TV and film actor; in Lake Charles, Louisiana

September 30, 1980 (Tuesday) 
Eight days after the invasion by Iraq, the Iranian Air Force carried out the first attack in history against a nuclear reactor, damaging the almost-completed reactor at the Osirak nuclear research center. Four Iranian F-4 Phantom jets flew deep into Iraq at high altitude, then fired bombs and missiles in a preventive strike at the facility  from the Iraqi capital of Baghdad. More than eight months later, Israel would destroy the reactor in its own preventive strike on June 7, 1981.
Digital Equipment Corporation, Intel and Xerox introduced the DIX standard for Ethernet, which was the first implementation outside of Xerox and the first to support 10 megabit per second speeds.
Born: 
Martina Hingis, Slovakian-born Swiss professional tennis player, singles champion at the Australian Open, Wimbledon and the U.S. Open and (from 1997 to 2001), the highest-paid female athlete in the world; in Košice, Czechoslovakia 
Guillermo Rigondeaux, Cuban professional boxer, WBA bantamweight and super-bantamweight champion; in Santiago de Cuba
Virgil Abloh, Ghanaian-American fashion designer; in Rockford, Illinois (d. 2021)

References

1980
1980-09
September 1980 events
1980-09